Haruhiko is a masculine Japanese given name. Notable people with the name include:

Haruhiko Arai (born 1947), Japanese screenwriter, publisher/editor of Eiga Geijutsu film magazine
Haruhiko Ash, founder of Eve of Destiny, a Japanese industrial rock band founded in 1999
Haruhiko Higashikuni (1887–1990), the 43rd Prime Minister of Japan for 54 days in 1945
Haruhiko Jō, Japanese actor, theatre director and voice actor
Haruhiko Kazama or List of Please Save My Earth characters "Please Save My Earth
Haruhiko Kindaichi (1913–2004), Japanese linguist and a scholar of Japanese linguistics Kokugogaku
Haruhiko Kon, Japanese field hockey player who competed in the 1932 Summer Olympics
Haruhiko Kuroda (born 1944), has been the president of the Asian Development Bank since February 2005
Haruhiko Mikimoto (born 1959), Japanese anime character designer, illustrator and manga artist
Haruhiko Nishi (1893–1986), Japanese diplomat
Haruhiko Okumura, Japanese engineer
Haruhiko Sato (born 1978), former Japanese football player
Haruhiko Shono (born 1960), Japanese computer graphics artist
Haruhiko Tanahashi, Japanese automotive engineer for the Lexus LFA supercar

Fictional characters 

 Haruhiko Ichijo (一条 晴彦), a character from Myriad Colors Phantom World
 Haruhiko Kobashikawa, the Ultimate Pilot from Danganronpa Another Despair Academy

See also
Haruka (disambiguation)
Haruki (disambiguation)
Haruko
Hiriko

Japanese masculine given names